Desmond Lee Yu-tai (born 25 October 1944) is a retired Hong Kong politician, a member of Eastern District Council for most of a 30-year period and a former member of the Legislative Council of Hong Kong.

Lee was born in Guangzhou. He was first elected to the Eastern District Board in 1985. In the same year when the indirect election for the Legislative Council was first introduced, he was elected to the council through the East Island electoral college consisting of members of the Eastern and Wan Chai District Board. He ran for re-election in 1988 but was defeated by Chan Ying-lun.

He joined the United Democrats of Hong Kong, the first major pro-democratic party in 1990 but quit in 1991.

He represented the Tanner constituency in the Eastern District until standing down in 2015.

References

1944 births
Living people
District councillors of Eastern District
Alumni of the Chinese University of Hong Kong
Hong Kong Civic Association politicians
Progressive Hong Kong Society politicians
Hong Kong Association for Democracy and People's Livelihood politicians
United Democrats of Hong Kong politicians
The Frontier (Hong Kong) politicians
Liberal Party (Hong Kong) politicians
HK LegCo Members 1985–1988